The Rose Stakes (Japanese ローズステークス) is a Japanese Grade 2 flat horse race in Hyōgo Prefecture for three-year-old Thoroughbred fillies. It is run over a distance of 1800 metres at Hanshin Racecourse in September, having been run over 2000 metres until 2006.

The Rose Stakes was first run in 1983 and was elevated to Grade 2 status in 1984. It serves as a trial race for the Shuka Sho. Winners of the race have included Daiwa Scarlet, Gentildonna and Sinhalite.

Winners since 2000 

 The 2020, 2021 and 2022 races took place at Chukyo Racecourse over 2000 metres.

Earlier winners

 1983 - Long Grace
 1984 - Long Leather
 1985 - Takeno Hinami
 1986 - Mejiro Ramonu
 1987 - Max Beauty
 1988 - Shiyono Roman
 1989 - Shadai Kagura
 1990 - Katsuno Jo
 1991 - Rinden Lily
 1992 - El Casa River
 1993 - Star Ballerina
 1994 - Hishi Amazon
 1995 - Silent Happiness
 1996 - Hishi Natalie
 1997 - Kyoei March
 1998 - Phalaenopsis
 1999 - Hishi Pinnacle

See also
 Horse racing in Japan
 List of Japanese flat horse races

References

Turf races in Japan
Recurring sporting events established in 1983
1983 establishments in Japan